Glaucosaurus is an extinct genus of small edaphosaurids from the Early Permian. The type species, G. megalops, was named in 1915.

Classification
Glaucosaurus is known only from its holotype, a partial skull and jaw. Almost all of the sutures have been obliterated. Nevertheless, there is broad agreement that Glaucosaurus is not only an edaphosaurid, but a close relative of Edaphosaurus itself.

All of the known sphenacodonts are carnivores except for certain therapsids. Glaucosaurus is plainly not a therapsid, e.g. because the lacrimal reaches the naris, the septomaxilla is large, there are no incisors, etc. And it is just as plainly not a carnivore, since it lacks cutting edges on the teeth or canine-like teeth. So, it is very likely to be an edaphosaur. Assuming that this is the case, it is very close to Edaphosaurus, because only Glaucosaurus and Edaphosaurus completely lack both canine teeth and a canine buttress, lack the transverse flange of the pterygoid, and have prefrontal with a ventral (descending) process which is expanded toward the middle of the skull, forming an anterior housing for the eyeball. However, Glaucosaurus differs from any of the known sorts of Edaphosaurus in have an incredibly long maxilla, and in the equally extreme length of the prefrontal's ventral process.

See also
List of pelycosaurs

References

External links
 The main groups of non-mammalian synapsids at Mikko's Phylogeny Archive

Edaphosaurids
Prehistoric synapsid genera
Cisuralian synapsids of North America
Taxa named by Samuel Wendell Williston
Fossil taxa described in 1915
Cisuralian genus first appearances
Cisuralian genus extinctions